Wu Zhaohui (born December 1966) is a Chinese computer scientist. He is a professor who had served as president of Zhejiang University from 2015 to 2022. He was elected to the Chinese Academy of Sciences in 2017.

Early life and education
Wu was born in Wenzhou, Zhejiang in December 1966. His father Wu Xuequan was academic director of Wenzhou No. 7 High School. He has a younger sister. He entered Zhejiang University in 1984, where he received his Ph.D. in computer science in 1993.

Career
Wu is a professor in the College of Computer Science and Technology at Zhejiang University before he was named in May 2015 to be President of the university. In 2007, he was assistant to university president and then vice president and executive vice president. Currently, he also serves as a director of the National Panel of Modern Service Industry, vice president of the China Association of Higher Education, and vice president of the Chinese Health Information Association.

Research
Wu's major research is focused on cyborg intelligence in the computer science and technology discipline. He was a chief scientist in the 973 Project and an information expert in the 863 Project. His research covers cyborg intelligence, A.I., service computing, and computational intelligence.

Awards
 Member, Chinese Academy of Sciences (2017)

References

1966 births
Living people
Alternate members of the 19th Central Committee of the Chinese Communist Party
Chinese computer scientists
Educators from Wenzhou
Members of the Chinese Academy of Sciences
Presidents of Zhejiang University
Scientists from Wenzhou
Zhejiang University alumni